Lover's Tear (Chinese: 誓不忘情) is a 1992 Hong Kong romance-action film directed by Jacob Cheung Chi-Leung and starring Nina Li Chi and Ngai Sing.

Plot
Deaf prostitute Fang I Ling (Nina Li Chi) is saved by gangster Lin Wei (Elvis Tsui Kam-Kong) who decides to make her his moll. Although he genuinely cares for her she doesn't feel the same way yet sticks by him. Things begin to change after she witnesses the murder of security official Su Erh (Yukari Oshima) and must help police officer  Chung Ao (Ngai Sing) who has been accused of the crime clear his name. The couple soon fall in love while being pursued by the chief lieutenant (Lam Ching-ying) and the police chief (Sammo Hung). Despite the police chief believing in Ngai's innocence he must do him duty by taking him in.

Cast
Nina Li Chi as Fang I Ling
Ngai Sing as love interest Inspector Chung Ho
Elvis Tsui as Fang's boyfriend Lin Wei
Lam Ching-ying as Chief Lieutenant Cheng Ying
Sammo Hung as Police Commissioner Kung

References

External links
 
 

Hong Kong crime films
1990s romantic action films
Hong Kong romance films
Hong Kong action films
1992 crime films
1992 films
1990s Hong Kong films